Huck PAC is the political action committee of former Arkansas Governor Mike Huckabee. It was founded in April 2008 by Huckabee, during the 2008 United States Republican presidential primaries. Its mission statement was, "Huck PAC is committed to helping Republicans regain control of the House and Senate, regain a majority of governorships and elect John McCain as the 44th president of the United States." It endorses candidates for various offices, then organizes into local groups in every U.S. county and assists the candidate.

On February 16, 2009, HuckPAC announced that Hogan Gidley would become the new director of HuckPAC.

References

External links 
 

Republican Party (United States) organizations
United States political action committees